The first USS Canon (PGM-90/PG-90) was a  in the United States Navy during the Vietnam War. She is currently on donation hold.

Canon was laid down by the Tacoma Boatbuilding Company, Tacoma, Washington on 28 June 1966,  and commissioned 24 June 1967.

Canon served off the coast of Vietnam as part of Operation Market Time. In one operation the ship took 8 rocket hits and 14 crew members wounded. One Navy Cross, three Silver Stars and five Bronze Stars were awarded to members of the crew.

Canon was decommissioned on 31 January 1977.

She is currently on donation hold, and is berthed at the Naval Inactive Ship Maintenance Facility in Philadelphia, Pennsylvania, while a group in Wisconsin works to bring her to Sheboygan, Wisconsin.

Canon has been identified as pending dismantling by the 2015 US Navy 30 year Shipbuilding Plan.

Awards
Meritorious Unit Commendation
Navy "E" Ribbon
National Defense Service Medal
Vietnam Service Medal with 3 campaign stars
Republic of Vietnam Gallantry Cross

References

 

1967 ships
Asheville-class gunboats
Ships built by Tacoma Boatbuilding Company